Benomyl (also marketed as Benlate) is a fungicide introduced in 1968 by DuPont. It is a systemic benzimidazole fungicide that is selectively toxic to microorganisms and invertebrates, especially earthworms, but nontoxic toward mammals. 

Due to the prevalence of resistance of parasitic fungi to benomyl, it and similar pesticides are of diminished effectiveness. Nonetheless it is widely used.

Toxicity
Benomyl is of low toxicity to mammals. It has an arbitrary LD50 of "greater than 10,000 mg/kg/day for rats". Skin irritation may occur through industrial exposure, and florists, mushroom pickers and floriculturists have reported allergic reactions to benomyl.

In a laboratory study, dogs fed benomyl in their diets for three months developed no major toxic effects, but did show evidence of altered liver function at the highest dose (150 mg/kg). With longer exposure, more severe liver damage occurred, including cirrhosis.

The US Environmental Protection Agency classified benomyl as a possible carcinogen. Carcinogenic studies have produced conflicting results. A two-year experimental study on mice has shown it "probably" causes an increase in liver tumours. The British Ministry of Agriculture Fisheries and Food took the view this was brought about by the hepatotoxic effect of benomyl.

In regards to occupational exposures to benomyl, the Occupational Safety and Health Administration has set a permissible exposure limit of 15 mg/m3 for total exposure over an eight-hour time-weighted average, and 5 mg/m3 for respiratory exposures.

Birth defects
In 1996, a Miami jury awarded US$4 million to a child whose mother was exposed in pregnancy to Benlate. The child was born without eyes (anophthalmia). The mother had been exposed to an unusually high dose of Benlate through her exposure from a near by farm, during pregnancy. An important issue in the case was the timing and magnitude of exposure.

In October 2008, DuPont paid confidential settlements to two New Zealand families whose children were born with either anophthalmia or other birth defects. The mother of one of the children had been exposed to Benlate while working as a Christchurch parks worker before his birth.

Environmental effects
Benomyl binds strongly to soil and does not dissolve in water to any great extent. It has a half-life in turf of three to six months, and in bare soil, a half-life of six months to one year.

In 1991, DuPont issued a recall of its Benlate 50DF formula due to suspected contamination with the herbicide atrazine. In the wake of the recall, many US growers blamed Benlate 50DF for destroying millions of dollars' worth of crops. Growers filed over 1,900 damage claims against DuPont, mostly involving ornamental crops in Florida. Subsequent testing by DuPont determined the recalled product was not contaminated with atrazine. The reason for the alleged crop damage is unclear. The Florida Department of Agriculture and Consumer Services suggested Benlate was contaminated with dibutylurea and sulfonylurea herbicides.

After several years of legal argument, DuPont paid out about US$750 million in damages and out-of-court settlements. By 1993, a coalition of farm worker and environmental groups came together to form "Benlate Victims Against DuPont", a group which called for a nationwide boycott of DuPont products.

After carrying out tests, DuPont denied Benlate was contaminated with dibutylurea and sulfonylureas and stopped compensation pay-outs. In 1995, a Florida judge rejected a complaint from the Florida Department of Agriculture that had alleged such a link.

Cellular biology
Benomyl is used in molecular biology to study the cell cycle in yeast; in fact, the name of the protein class "Bub" (Bub1, etc.) comes from their mutant in which budding was uninhibited by benomyl. Benomyl acts by depolymerizing microtubules. Benomyl is also useful in the laboratory because it is selectively toxic to most members of the Ascomycota, whereas members of the Basidiomycota are largely resistant.

References

Further reading
 Tomlin, C., (Ed.) The Pesticide Manual, 10th Edition, British Crop Protection Council/Royal Society of Medicine, 1994.
 Benomyl, Extoxnet, Pesticide Management Education Program, Cornell University, NY, May 1994.
 World Health Organization, WHO/PCS/94.87 Data sheet on benomyl, Geneva, 1994.
 Whitehead, R (Ed) The UK Pesticide Guide, British Crop Protection Council/CAB International, 1996.
 Thomas, M.R. and Garthwaite, D.G., Orchards and Fruit Stores in Great Britain 1992, Pesticide Usage Survey Report 115, Central Science Laboratory, 1994.
 Thomas, M.R. and Garthwaite, D.G., Outdoor Bulbs and Flowers in Great Britain 1993, Pesticide Usage Survey Report 121, Central Science Laboratory, 1995.
 Garthwaite, D.G., Thomas, M.R., Hart, M.J, and Wild, S, Outdoor vegetable crops in Great Britain 1995, Pesticide Usage Survey Report 134, Central Science Laboratory, 1997.
 Thomas, M.R. and Garthwaite, D.G., Hardy Nursery Stock in Great Britain 1993, Pesticide Usage Survey Report 120, Central Science Laboratory, 1995.
 Benomyl evaluation No. 57, MAFF, July 1992, pp109–111.
 More problems for Benlate? Agrow, 13 March 1992, p13.
 List of Chemicals Evaluated for Carcinogenic Potential, US EPA Office of Pesticide Programs, Washington, US, 1996.
 Benomyl, Environmental Health Criteria No 148 , World Health Organization, Geneva, Switzerland, 1993.

External links

Fungicides
Benzimidazoles
Carbamates
Suspected testicular toxicants
Microtubule inhibitors
Guanidines